Rockcastle, formerly Rock Castle, is an unincorporated community in Trigg County, Kentucky, United States.

History
A post office was in operation at Rockcastle from 1839 until 1915. The community derives its name from a nearby rock formation called Castle Rock. for strategic reasons rockcastle was burned during the war. Old Rockcastle now lies under lake barkley

References

Unincorporated communities in Trigg County, Kentucky
Unincorporated communities in Kentucky